Majgull Axelsson (born 1947 in Landskrona) is a Swedish journalist and writer.

She grew up in Nässjö and completed her education in journalism.

Life and career 
Her first book was non-fiction, and focused on the problems of child prostitution and street children in third world, and poverty in Sweden. April witch is her second novel, and one that was well received in Sweden. With over 400,000 copies sold in hardcover, it landed on several bestseller lists for months and received important Swedish literature awards including the Moa Martinsson Prize and Jörgen Eriksson's Prize. It addresses themes of mother-daughter relationships, competition between women, and the failures of Sweden's postwar welfare state.

Axelsson lives with her husband on Lidingö.

Bibliography

Non-fiction 
 1986 – Our Smallest Brothers (Våra minsta bröder)
 1989 – Rosario Is Dead (Rosario är död)
 1991 – They Kill Us (De dödar oss)
 1996 – And Those Who Don't Have (...och dom som inte har)

Fiction 
 1994 – Far away from Nifelheim (Långt borta från Nifelheim)
 1997 – April Witch (Aprilhäxan)
 2000 – Random House (Slumpvandring)
 2004 – The Woman I Never Was (Den jag aldrig var)
 2008 – Ice and Water, Water and Ice  (Is och vatten, vatten och is)
 2011 – Moderspassion ("Mother's Passion")
 2014 – Jag heter inte Miriam ("My Name Is Not Miriam")
 2017 – Ditt liv och mitt ("Your Life and Mine")

Plays 
 2002 – LisaLouise

External links 

 April Witch review

References 

1947 births
Living people
Swedish-language writers
Litteris et Artibus recipients
August Prize winners
Moa Award recipients
Writers from Småland